Sabashahr (also Romanized as Sabāshahr; formerly, Qāsemābād) is a city in the Central District of Shahriar County, Tehran province, Iran. At the 2006 census, its population was 18,132 in 4,472 households. The following census in 2011 counted 47,123 people in 12,674 households. The latest census in 2016 showed a population of 53,971 people in 15,850 households.

References 

Shahriar County

Cities in Tehran Province

Populated places in Tehran Province

Populated places in Shahriar County